Gilbert Carlton Walker (August 1, 1833 – May 11, 1885) was a United States political figure. He served as the 36th Governor of Virginia, first as a Republican provisional governor between 1869 and 1870, and again as a Democrat elected governor from 1870 to 1874. He was the last Republican governor of Virginia until Linwood Holton took office in 1970.

Early and family life
Walker was born in Binghamton, New York on August 1, 1833, the son of Sabinus Walker and Matilda (Galloway) Walker. Walker's parents separated when he was young, and his mother married Donald Grant of Chenango, New York. He attended academies in Delaware, New York and Binghamton, New York, then attended Williams College in Williamstown, Massachusetts from 1851 to 1852.

In 1854, Walker received a Bachelor of Arts degree from Hamilton College in Clinton, New York. While in college, he became a member of the Sigma Phi fraternity, and he won the college's first prize for declamation during his junior year. He studied law with Judge Horace S. Griswold of Binghamton and was admitted to the bar in 1855. In 1857 he received his Master of Arts degree from Hamilton.

Legal and business career
Walker practiced in Owego, New York, from 1855 to 1859, and in Chicago from 1859 to 1864. He moved to Norfolk, Virginia, in 1864 and practiced law. Walker also became involved in finance and served as president of Norfolk's Exchange National Bank. His other business ventures included serving on the board of directors of the American Fire Insurance Company of Norfolk. In 1866, he was an original incorporator of the Norfolk Insurance and Trust Company. Walker was also a director of the Atlantic Iron Works and Dock Company and served as its president from 1866 to 1869. Walker was president of Richmond, Virginia's Granite Insurance Company from 1874 to 1878 and editor and publisher of the Richmond Enquirer from 1874 to 1875.

Political career
Walker served as Governor of Virginia from 1869 to 1874. He also served as a Democrat in the Forty-fourth and Forty-fifth Congresses (March 4, 1875 – March 3, 1879). In the Forty-fourth Congress, he was chair of the Committee on Education and Labor. He did not stand for reelection in 1878.

Later years
Walker resettled in Binghamton, New York, in 1879 and resumed his legal practice. He moved to New York City in 1881, where he continued practicing law. Walker remained active in business ventures, including serving as president of the New York Underground Railroad Company.

Death and burial
Walker died in New York City on May 11, 1885. He was buried at Spring Forest Cemetery in Binghamton.

Family
In 1857, Walker married Olive E. Evans of Binghamton.

Electoral history
1869; Walker was elected Governor of Virginia with 54.15% of the vote, defeating fellow Republican Henry H. Wells.
1874; Walker was elected to the U.S. House of Representatives with 55.33% of the vote, defeating Republican Rush Bargess and Independent R.A. Paul.
1876; Walker was re-elected with 53.64% of the vote, defeating Republican Charles S. Mills.

Notes

References

External links

A Guide to the Governor Gilbert Carlton Walker Executive Papers, 1869-1873 at The Library of Virginia

|-

1833 births
1885 deaths
American bankers
19th-century American railroad executives
Governors of Virginia
Hamilton College (New York) alumni
Illinois lawyers
New York (state) lawyers
Politicians from Chicago
Politicians from New York City
Virginia lawyers
Williams College alumni
Democratic Party members of the United States House of Representatives from Virginia
Democratic Party governors of Virginia
Virginia Republicans
Republican Party governors of Virginia
Lawyers from Chicago
19th-century American politicians
19th-century American lawyers